is a mountain located in Miyada, Kamiina District, and Kiso and Agematsu, Kiso District, Nagano Prefecture, in the Chūbu region of Japan. It is also included on the list of "100 Famous Japanese Mountains." Sometimes its name is just shortened to Kisokoma. Alternative kanji for the name are 木曾駒ヶ岳 (Kisokoma-ga-take).

Geography 
 
The Ina Valley is located between the "two Koma Mountains." Mount Kisokoma is referred to as the western of the two mountains, while Mount Kaikoma is referred to as the eastern one. The mountain consists of Granite. The upper part of the mountain range is the Tree line, and many Alpine plants grow naturally. Leontopodium shinanense of Leontopodium is the Endemism around Mount Kisokoma. It is called  in Japanese. Also, Siberian Dwarf Pine can be seen around the top of the mountain.

Rivers that become source 
The following rivers that become the sources flows to the Ise Bay and the Pacific Ocean.
 Name River, Shōzawa River (Tributary of Kiso River)
 Odagiri River,  Ōtagiri River (Tributary of Tenryū River)

Mountaineering and Lodgings 
There is the Komagatake Ropeway in the east side of Mount Kisokoma. Many tourists and hikers visit the station on the top. There are five mountain huts and one hotel on the mountain. The hotel is named "Hotel Senjōjiki," after the cirque on the mountain. There is one campground near the lodge between Mount Kisokoma and Mount Naka. There are many mountain climbing trails in the surrounding area.

Scenery of Mount Kisokoma

See also

 Komagatake Ropeway
 100 Famous Japanese Mountains
 Mount Hōken

References

Kiso Mountains
Japan Alps
Kisokoma, Mount